Sanjaajamtsyn Altantuyaa (born March 6, 1976) is a Mongolian former swimmer, who specialized in sprint freestyle events. Altantuyaa competed for Mongolia in the women's 100 m freestyle at the 2000 Summer Olympics in Sydney. She received a ticket from FINA, under a Universality program, in an entry time of 1:04.00. She challenged seven other swimmers in heat one, including 15-year-olds Maria Awori of Kenya Nathalie Lee Baw of Mauritius. Diving in with the slowest reaction of 1.13 seconds, Altantuyaa fought her way from behind the pack to save a seventh spot over Tajikistan's Katerina Izmaylova by almost nine seconds in 1:10.22. Altantuyaa failed to advance into the semifinals, as she placed fifty-third overall in the prelims.

References

External links
 

1976 births
Living people
Mongolian female swimmers
Olympic swimmers of Mongolia
Swimmers at the 2000 Summer Olympics
Mongolian female freestyle swimmers
Sportspeople from Ulaanbaatar